Willem Gerhardus "Willie" Hills (born 26 January 1962) is a former South African rugby union player.

Playing career

Hills represented the Northern Transvaal Schools team and under–20 team as a flanker and made his debut for the Northern Transvaal senior team in 1990, playing hooker. Hills toured with the Springboks to France and England in 1992, when he was originally included at tighthead, and made his test debut at hooker against France on 17 October 1992 at Stade de Gerland in Lyon. Hills got injured in the first test against Australia in 1993, playing loosehead, effectively ending his test career. He played six test matches and seven tour matches for the Springboks.

Test history

See also
List of South Africa national rugby union players – Springbok no. 575

References

1962 births
Living people
South African rugby union players
South Africa international rugby union players
Blue Bulls players
Rugby union players from Pretoria
Rugby union hookers
Rugby union props